The Central Business District (CBD) of Miami is the historic central business district and city center of what has become Greater Downtown Miami in Miami, Florida. Over 92,000 people work in Miami's Central Business District. 

The Central Business District is generally bound by Biscayne Boulevard, Bayfront Park and Museum Park on the east, the Miami River to the south, North 6th Street to the north, and Interstate 95 to the west. While it is technically Miami's official "downtown", the term "Downtown Miami" has come to refer to a much larger  area along the bay from the Rickenbacker Causeway to the Julia Tuttle Causeway. It is also distinct from the financial district, which neighbors Brickell to the south. 

History

The City of Miami was officially incorporated as a city on July 28, 1896 with a population of just over 300.  Downtown is the historic heart of Miami, and along with Coconut Grove, is the oldest settled area of Miami, with early pioneer settlement dating to the early 19th century. Urban development began in the 1890s with the construction of the Florida East Coast Railway by Standard Oil industrialist Henry Flagler down to Miami at the insistence of Julia Tuttle. Flagler, along with developers such as William Brickell and George E. Merrick helped bring developer interest to the city with the construction of hotels, resorts, homes, and the extension of Flagler's rail line. Flagler Street, originating in Downtown, is a major east-west road in Miami named after the tycoon; the Julia Tuttle Causeway, crossing Biscayne Bay just north of Downtown in Edgewater, is named in honor of Tuttle.

Character

The CBD has long been dense with retail and office space, as well as some lofts and apartments, but recently has seen large scale high-rise residential development as during Miami housing market booms in the aughts and continuing again in the 2010s. Though the historically wealthy suburb of Brickell to the south remains much more popular, downtown has seen urban buildings such as The Loft, The Loft 2, and Centro Lofts which have no built-in parking as well as more traditional luxury condos such as the bayfront 50 Biscayne and Vizcayne. Wolfson Campus, the primary (but not largest) campus of Miami-Dade College is located in the CBD, with about ten buildings around NE 5 Street and NE 2 Ave. The historic Flagler Street, which is the north-south divider of the street grid in Miami-Dade, may undergo a major renovation from the Miami River to the terminus at Biscayne Boulevard starting by 2016. The project was publicized in 2014 and has faced several delays.

Transportation

The Metromover Inner Loop is located entirely within the CBD, as is Metrorail's Government Center station, where the rapid transit and people mover systems meet. This is the busiest station for both systems and sees over 15,000 riders on an average weekday. It is located on the west side of downtown in the Government Center area, which has a large concentration of city, county, state, and federal offices. The area is also heavily served by the Metrobus (Miami-Dade County) and Miami Trolley, as well as taxicabs, ridesharing companies, and shared scooters. Downtown Miami as defined by Walk Score which includes Brickell and the Arts & Entertainment District, is considered "very walkable" and as having "world-class public transportation", as well as being "very bikeable".

Gallery

See also
Downtown Miami Historic District
List of tallest buildings in Miami

References

External links
Miami Downtown Development Authority

Central business districts in the United States
Economy of Miami
Neighborhoods in Miami